Reon Cuffy (born 17 June 1999) is a Dominican footballer who currently plays for East Central FC of the Dominica Premier League, and the Dominica national team.

Club career
Cuffy began his career with Exodus FC. In 2018 he moved to East Central FC of the Dominica Premier League. Following the season Cuffy moved to All Saints United of the Antigua and Barbuda Premier Division. The Dominican scored in the semi-finals of the Warrior Cup to help the Antiguan club reach the final. After one season with the club he returned to Dominica and East Central FC.

International career
Cuffy made five appearances for Dominica in the 2018 CONCACAF U-20 Championship, scoring one goal. His goal came in a 3–2 victory over  Saint Kitts and Nevis.  In October 2018 he represented the under-20 team again in a series of youth friendlies hosted by the Barbados Football Association. Cuffy scored his team's second goal in an eventual 1–1 draw with the hosts. In July 2019 he was included in the under-23 squad for 2020 CONCACAF Men's Olympic Qualifying Championship qualification.

He was called up to the senior squad for the first time in March 2018. He went on to his senior international debut on 11 August 2018 in a friendly against Guadeloupe.

International career statistics

References

External links
 
 
 

Living people
1999 births
Association football forwards
Dominica footballers
Dominica expatriate footballers
Dominica international footballers
Dominica under-20 international footballers
People from Saint Andrew Parish, Dominica
Expatriate footballers in Antigua and Barbuda
Dominica expatriate sportspeople in Antigua and Barbuda